Tine Urnaut (born 3 September 1988) is a Slovenian volleyball player who plays for JTEKT Stings and the Slovenian national team. With Slovenia, he was the runner-up of the European Volleyball Championship three times, in 2015, 2019 and 2021.

Career

National team
On 14 August 2015, Slovenia, including Urnaut, won a gold medal in the 2015 European League. With Slovenia, he was also a runner-up of the 2015 European Championship (lost 3–0 against France in the final). Urnaut received an individual award for the Best Outside Spiker of the tournament.

Honours
ACH Volley
CEV Cup: 2006–07
Slovenian Championship: 2006–07, 2007–08

Olympiacos Piraeus
Greek Championship: 2008–09

ZAKSA Kędzierzyn-Koźle
CEV Cup runner-up: 2010–11

Diatec Trentino
CEV Champions League runner-up: 2015–16
CEV Cup runner-up: 2016–17

Allianz Powervolley Milano
CEV Challenge Cup: 2020–21

JTEKT Stings
Emperor's Cup and Empress' Cup All Japan Volleyball Championship: 2022

Individual
 Men's European Volleyball Championship Best Outside Spiker: 2015
 CEV Champions League Best Outside Spiker: 2016

References

External links

 
 Player profile at LegaVolley.it 
 Player profile at PlusLiga.pl 
 Player profile at Volleybox.net

1988 births
Living people
Sportspeople from Slovenj Gradec
Slovenian men's volleyball players
Slovenian Champions of men's volleyball
Greek Champions of men's volleyball
Mediterranean Games medalists in volleyball
Mediterranean Games bronze medalists for Slovenia
Competitors at the 2009 Mediterranean Games
Slovenian expatriate sportspeople in Greece
Expatriate volleyball players in Greece
Slovenian expatriate sportspeople in Italy
Expatriate volleyball players in Italy
Slovenian expatriate sportspeople in Poland
Expatriate volleyball players in Poland
Slovenian expatriate sportspeople in Turkey
Expatriate volleyball players in Turkey
Slovenian expatriate sportspeople in Qatar
Expatriate volleyball players in Qatar
Slovenian expatriate sportspeople in China
Expatriate volleyball players in China
Slovenian expatriate sportspeople in Russia
Expatriate volleyball players in Russia
Slovenian expatriate sportspeople in Japan
Expatriate volleyball players in Japan
Olympiacos S.C. players
ZAKSA Kędzierzyn-Koźle players
Umbria Volley players
Arkas Spor volleyball players
Trentino Volley players
Modena Volley players
VC Zenit Saint Petersburg players
Opposite hitters
Outside hitters